The Guy A. Brown House is a historic two-story house in Lincoln, Nebraska. It was built in 1874 as a private residence for Guy A. Brown, a Civil War veteran who became Nebraska's State Librarian as well as the clerk and reporter of the Nebraska Supreme Court. The house was designed in the Italianate style, with an American Craftsman porch. It was remodelled as a duplex in 1935. It has been listed on the National Register of Historic Places since March 5, 1998.

References

		
National Register of Historic Places in Lincoln, Nebraska
Italianate architecture in Nebraska
Houses completed in 1874
1874 establishments in Nebraska